The Roman Catholic Diocese of Tsiroanomandidy is a suffragan Latin diocese in the Ecclesiastical province of Antananarivo in Madagascar, yet depends on the missionary Roman Congregation for the Evangelization of Peoples.

Its cathedral episcopal see is the (Marian) Cathédrale Notre Dame du Bon Remède, in Tsiroanomandidy, Antananarivo Province.

Statistics 
As per 2014, it pastorally served 223,433 Catholics (37.2% of 600,167 total) on 40,000 km2 in 3 parishes and 19 missions with 45 priests (28 diocesan, 17 religious), 168 lay religious (36 brothers, 132 sisters) and 32 seminarians.

History 
 Established on January 13, 1949 as Apostolic Prefecture of Tsiroanomandidy, on territory split off from the Apostolic Vicariate of Miarinarivo
 Promoted on December 11, 1958 as Diocese of Tsiroanomandidy
 Lost territory (like two other sees) on 2017.02.08 to establish the Diocese of Maintirano.

Ordinaries 
(all Roman rite; so far -mostly European missionary- members of Latin congregations)

Apostolic Prefect of Tsiroanomandidy 
 Father Angel Martínez Vivas, Trinitarians (O.SS.T.) (1949.01.14 – 1958.12.11 see below)

Suffragan Bishops of Tsiroanomandidy 
 Angel Martínez Vivas, O.SS.T. (see above 1958.12.11 – retired 1977.07.30), died 1981
 Jean-Samuel Raobelina, Missionaries of Our Lady of LaSalette (M.S.) (born Madagascar) (1978.04.27 – death 2001.06.30)
 Gustavo Bombin Espino, O.SS.T. (2003.10.04 – 2017.02.08), next first Bishop of co-daughter-see Diocese of Maintirano
 Gabriel Randrianantenaina (2021.04.30 – ...)

See also 
 Roman Catholicism in Madagascar

Sources and external links 
 GCatholic.org, with Google satellite photo
 Catholic Hierarchy

Roman Catholic dioceses in Madagascar
Christian organizations established in 1949
Roman Catholic dioceses and prelatures established in the 20th century
1949 establishments in Madagascar
Roman Catholic Ecclesiastical Province of Antananarivo
Religion in Bongolava